Events in the year 2007 in Finland.

Incumbents
President – Tarja Halonen
Prime Minister – Matti Vanhanen

Events
18 March – the 2007 Finnish parliamentary election
10 & 12 May - Eurovision Song Contest 2007
21 October – Kimi Raikkonen wins the Championship against Fernando Alonso and Lewis Hamilton, in Brazil

Deaths

2 January – Eino Lehtinen, veteran of the Finnish Civil War (b. 1900)
6 January – Alvar Saukko, civil servant and politician (b. 1929).
31 January – Kirka, musician (b. 1950)
21 February – Oiva Halmetoja, athlete (b. 1920).
27 February – Raimo Karlsson, wrestler (b. 1948).
24 March – Pentti Ikonen, swimmer (b. 1934).
8 April – Osmo Harkimo, cinematographer (b. 1923)
14 April – Reino Poutanen, rower (b. 1928).
15 April – Paavo Tiilikainen, politician (b. 1923).
16 April – Kaarlo Yrjö-Koskinen, baron, journalist and diplomat (b. 1930)
29 April – Pentti Lehto, illustrator, caricaturist, cartoonist and author of children's books (b. 1924)
30 April – Eeki Mantere, musician (b. 1949).
18 May – Rainer Lemström, politician (b. 1931).
30 May – Toivo Telen, shot putter (b. 1924).
4 June – Antti Viskari, long-distance runner (b. 1928).
23 July – Ragnar Wikström, figure skater (b. 1940)
9 August – Rolf Wiik, fencer (b. 1929).
23 August – Martti Pokela, folk musician and composer (b. 1924).
27 September – Marjatta Raita, actress (b. 1944)
29 September – Jorma Räty, weightlifter (b. 1946)
14 October – Pentti Snellman, athlete (b. 1926).
4 November – Lennart Rönnback, White Guard veteran of the Finnish Civil War of 1918 (b. 1905)
22 December – Esko Valkama, footballer (b. 1924).
26 December – Voitto Liukkonen, sports commentator (b. 1940)
27 December – Pentti Pakarinen, ophthalmologist and politician (b. 1924).
31 December – Markku Peltola, actor and musician (b. 1956)

References

 
2000s in Finland
Finland
Finland
Years of the 21st century in Finland